Organic photonics includes the generation, emission, transmission, modulation, signal processing, switching, amplification, and detection/sensing of light, using organic optical materials.

Fields within  organic photonics include the liquid organic dye laser and solid-state organic dye lasers.  Materials used in solid-state dye lasers include:

 laser dye-doped PMMA
 laser dye-doped ormosil
 laser dye-doped polymer-nanoparticle matrices
 laser dye-doped bio-based gain media

Organic-inorganic nanoparticle gain media are nanocomposites developed for solid-state dye lasers and can also be utilized in biosensors, bio analytics, and nonlinear organic photonics applications.

An additional class of organic materials used in the generation of laser light include organic semiconductors. Conjugated polymers are widely used as optically-pumped organic semiconductors.

See also

Conjugated polymers
Nonlinear optics
Organic laser
Organic semiconductor
Polymer
Nanoparticle
Photonics

References

Photonics